Afran Ismayilov (born on 8 October 1988) is an Azerbaijani professional footballer who plays as a midfielder for Azerbaijan Premier League side Kapaz.

Early years
Ismayilov was born in Baku, Azerbaijan, started playing football at age 8 and attended Neftchi Baku football school under Rovshan Gasimov.

Career

Club
Ismayilov began his career at the FK Qarabağ academy in 2004 after being chosen as one of three talents among 1200 amateur players. He was one of key players for FK Qarabağ's good performances in club's 2010–11 UEFA Europa League qualification campaign, having scored 5 goals against opponents.

In July 2014, Ismayilov moved to Khazar Lankaran along with Rauf Aliyev. After six months with Khazar, Ismayilov signed a six-month deal with Inter Baku.

On 24 May 2018, Qarabağ announced that Ismayilov had been released by the club following expiration of his contract.

On 11 June 2018, Ismayilov signed one-year contract with Sumgayit FK.

On 13 August 2019, Ismayilov signed a one-year contract with Keşla FK. On 29 June, Keşla announced Ismayilov's contract hadn't been renewed and he'd left the club.

International
Ismayilov is a part of the Azerbaijan U-21 side that is competing in the 2011 European Under-21 Championship qualification.

In 2010, he was called up for the Azerbaijan national football team and scored his first goal on his debut in friendly match against Jordan national football team in Amman.

Career statistics

Club

International

Statistics accurate as of match played 30 January 2018

International goals
Scores and results list Azerbaijan's goal tally first.

Honours
Qarabağ
Azerbaijan Premier League (2): 2015–16, 2016–17

References

External links
 
 Profile on official club website
 

1988 births
Living people
Footballers from Baku
Azerbaijani footballers
Azerbaijan international footballers
Association football midfielders
Qarabağ FK players
Turan-Tovuz IK players
FC Baku players
Khazar Lankaran FK players
Shamakhi FK players
Sumgayit FK players
Azerbaijan Premier League players
Kapaz PFK players